Thomas W. Johnson is a former member of the Ohio House of Representatives. Johnson began his career in the House in 1977 and served 22 years, representing Southeast Ohio. He served as House Finance and Appropriations Chair. In 1999, he resigned to serve as Director of the Office of Budget and Management in the cabinet of Governor Bob Taft. In 2006, he was appointed Executive-in-Residence of the John Glenn School Public Affairs at The Ohio State University and served as Assistant Vice-President of Financial Services before leaving the University.

Johnson was appointed to the Public Utilities Commission of Ohio (PUCO) by Governor John Kasich in April 2014. Johnson served as PUCO Chairman for the first year of his term, and presently, he serves as a Commissioner.  His PUCO term ends April 2019.

References

Republican Party members of the Ohio House of Representatives
Ohio State University faculty
Living people
Year of birth missing (living people)